James Paul Ulm is a retired brigadier general in the United States Air Force.

Biography 
Ulm was born in Frankfort, Indiana in 1937 and raised in Lakewood, Ohio. He graduated from George Washington University with a master's degree in 1973.

Career 
Ulm graduated from the United States Air Force Academy with a bachelor's degree in 1961. He then began training at Reese Air Force Base. After the completion of his training, he was stationed at McChord AFB. Ulm underwent further training in 1965 and was later stationed at Andersen Air Force Base. In 1968, he was deployed to serve in the Vietnam War and was assigned to Tuy Hoa Air Base.

After returning to the United States, he served at Military Airlift Command and the United States Air Force Academy. He then attended the Naval War College. In 1973, he was assigned to The Pentagon. From there, he became a recruiting squadron commander in Milwaukee, Wisconsin. In 1978, Ulm joined the 71st Flying Training Wing. During that time, he commanded the 8th Flying Training Squadron. In 1981, he began attending the Air War College.

From 1982 to 1983, he served as Deputy Commander for Operations of the 64th Flying Training Wing. He then became Director of Standardization and Evaluation of Air Training Command. In 1984, Ulm assumed command of the 14th Flying Training Wing. He returned to Air Training Command in 1987 as Inspector General. Later that year, he transferred to North American Aerospace Defense Command as Command Director. He became Vice Director of Combat Operations in 1989 and Director of the Planning Staff in 1990. Ulm retired in 1991.

Awards he received during his career include the Legion of Merit, the Distinguished Flying Cross, the Meritorious Service Medal with three oak leaf clusters and the Air Medal with four oak leaf clusters.

References 

1937 births
Living people
People from Frankfort, Indiana
People from Lakewood, Ohio
United States Air Force Academy alumni
United States Air Force personnel of the Vietnam War
Recipients of the Air Medal
George Washington University alumni
College of Naval Command and Staff alumni
Air War College alumni
Recipients of the Legion of Merit
United States Air Force generals